Hurling in County Cork is administered by the Cork County Board of the Gaelic Athletic Association.

History

Clubs
Senior Clubs 2013.
Blackrock National Hurling Club
Ballymartle 
Sarsfield
Carrigtwohill 
Bishopstown
Douglas 
Bride Rovers
Glen Rovers 
Ballinhassig
Midleton 
Erins Own
Newtownshandrum 
Killeagh
St Finbarrs 
Na Piarsaigh

County teams

The Cork senior hurling team represents Cork in the National Hurling League and the All-Ireland Senior Hurling Championship. There are also Cork intermediate hurling team|intermediate, Cork junior hurling team|junior, Cork under-21 hurling team|under-21 and Cork minor hurling team|minor teams.

References

External links
Cork GAA

 
Hurling